Terence Armstrong (born 10 July 1958) is an English former footballer who played as a midfielder for Huddersfield Town and Port Vale in a nine-year career in the Football League. He helped Port Vale to win promotion out of the Fourth Division in 1982–83. He later played non-league football for Nuneaton Borough and Northwich Victoria.

Career
Armstrong played for Huddersfield Town, and made four Fourth Division appearances in the 1976–77 season. He made 19 appearances in the 1977–78 season, and scored once in a 4–1 win over Doncaster Rovers at Leeds Road on 1 October. Manager Tom Johnston was then replaced by Mick Buxton, though Armstrong continued make progress in the first team, starting 15 league games in 1978–79, and scoring once in a 2–1 home win over AFC Bournemouth on 13 March. However he did not feature at all in the title winning 1979–80 campaign, and was also absent throughout the 1980–81 season, before signing with Fourth Division Port Vale in February 1981.

Armstrong made 17 appearances for the "Valiants" at the end of the 1980–81 campaign, and claimed goals against Hereford United and Peterborough United. He featured 42 times in the 1981–82 season, scoring goals against Hartlepool United and Lincoln City. He scored seven goals in 45 games in the 1982–83 promotion campaign, including a brace in a 4–1 win over Mansfield Town at Vale Park. However he and numerous other players fell out with manager John McGrath over player wages, and as a result Armstrong, Barry Siddall, Russell Bromage, and Geoff Hunter all remained on weekly contracts. Armstrong hit two goals in 21 matches in the 1983–84 season as Vale were relegated out of the Third Division, despite an upturn in form under new boss John Rudge. Armstrong began to be plagued by a nagging knee injury, which required a cartilage operation. His injury kept him limited to just six appearances in the 1984–85 campaign, and he left the club on a free transfer to non-league Nuneaton Borough in May 1985, later moving on to Alliance Premier League rivals Northwich Victoria.

Post-retirement
In April 2003, he lost his job as a prison warder at Wakefield Prison after he was jailed for 28 days for sending sexually explicit material to the husband of his former lover - an act which was in breach of a restraining order. He also graffitied a motorway bridge as an insult to the husband of his former lover.

Career statistics
Source:

Honours
Port Vale
Football League Fourth Division third-place promotion: 1982–83

References

1958 births
Living people
English footballers
Footballers from Barnsley
Association football midfielders
Huddersfield Town A.F.C. players
Port Vale F.C. players
Nuneaton Borough F.C. players
Northwich Victoria F.C. players
English Football League players
National League (English football) players
British prison officers